Southern Railway 154 is a 2-8-0 G class steam locomotive built in 1890 by Schenectady Locomotive Works for Southern Railway.

History
The locomotive was originally delivered in 1890 to the East Tennessee, Virginia and Georgia Railway (ETV&G) as #466. In 1894, ETV&G was merged with the Richmond and Danville Railroad to form the Southern Railway and 466 was renumbered to 154. During the locomotive's service life, #154 has worked on the Knoxville to Bristol and the Knoxville to Asheville divisions of the Southern, the engine was also leased to the Gloucester Lumber Company in Asheville in 1946 and has worked on the Murphy Branch. On at least one occasion (Autumn 1951), #154 was rented by the Smoky Mountain Railroad for temporary service as a road engine. In the engine's later years, #154 served as the "goat" (railroad slang for yard switcher) at City Yard in Knoxville until its retirement in August 1953 and given to the City of Knoxville to be put on display at Chilhowee Park.

When Knoxville's 1982 World's Fair was being planned, restoration of the locomotive for local excursions was seriously considered. However, Southern Railway inspectors deemed the task too daunting and, as a result, unworthy of the expense. In 1989, the locomotive was given to the Old Smoky Railway Museum which donated the locomotive to the Gulf & Ohio Railway in August 2008. The City of Knoxville and Old Smoky Chapter of the National Railway Historical Society made plans to restore 154 and it became the oldest operating Southern Railway steam locomotive. On July 3, 2010, #154 made its debut at the Three Rivers Rambler and pulled its first passenger train on the Gulf & Ohio Railways.

However, in August 2013, #154's bell had been stolen by a thief who had climbed over the fence and cradled to the Gulf & Ohio Railway yard where the locomotive was parked last night. On January 20, 2015, #154's bell was finally recovered when the Knox County Sheriff's Office deputies investigate a house on Kimberlin Heights Road, recovering everything from stolen cars to lawn equipment.

References

External links

Individual locomotives of the United States
2-8-0 locomotives
Steam locomotives of Southern Railway (U.S.)
ALCO locomotives
Railway locomotives introduced in 1890
Standard gauge locomotives of the United States

Preserved steam locomotives of Tennessee